Eurhodope cinerea is a species of snout moth in the genus Eurhodope. It was described by Staudinger in 1879, and is known from Cyprus and Lebanon.

References

Moths described in 1879
Phycitini